The Shire of Oxley was a local government area in Victoria, Australia, immediately to the south of the city of Wangaratta, which housed the shire's council chambers.

History

The Oxley Road District was incorporated on 21 November 1862, and became a shire on 12 December 1865, after changes to local government legislation. Subsequently, it was divided into Eastern, Central and Western Ridings, each of which elected three councillors.

On 18 November 1994, the Shire of Oxley was abolished, and along with the City of Wangaratta, the Shire of Wangaratta and various surrounding districts, was merged into the newly created Rural City of Wangaratta.

The councillors of the Oxley Shire commissioned Graham Jones to prepare a history of the shire, which was published in 1995 as Memories of Oxley.

Towns

Population

* Estimate in the 1958 Victorian Year Book.

References

External links
 Victorian Places - Oxley Shire

Oxley
1862 establishments in Australia